Man and the Biosphere Programme (MAB) is an intergovernmental scientific program, launched in 1971 by UNESCO, that aims to establish a scientific basis for the improvement of relationships between people and their environments.

MAB's work engages fully with the international development agenda—specially with the Sustainable Development Goals and the Post 2015 Development Agenda—and addresses challenges linked to scientific, environmental, societal and development issues in diverse ecosystems; from mountain regions to marine, coastal and island areas; from tropical forests to dry lands and urban areas. MAB combines the natural and social sciences, economics and education to improve human livelihoods and the equitable sharing of benefits, and to safeguard natural and managed ecosystems, thus promoting innovative approaches to economic development that are socially and culturally appropriate, and environmentally sustainable.

The MAB program provides a unique platform for cooperation on research and development, capacity-building and networking to share information, knowledge and experience on three interlinked issues: biodiversity loss, climate change and sustainable development. It contributes not only to better understanding of the environment, but also promotes greater involvement of science and scientists in policy development concerning the wise use of biological diversity.

, 727 biosphere reserves in 131 countries, including 22 transboundary sites, have been included in the World Network of Biosphere Reserves.

Biosphere reserves
Biosphere reserves are areas comprising terrestrial, marine and coastal ecosystems. Each reserve promotes solutions reconciling the conservation of biodiversity with its sustainable use. Biosphere reserves are nominated by national governments and remain under the sovereign jurisdiction of the states where they are located. Their status is internationally recognized.

Biosphere reserves are ‘Science for Sustainability support sites’ – special places for testing interdisciplinary approaches to understanding and managing changes and interactions between social and ecological systems, including conflict prevention and management of biodiversity.

Biosphere reserves have three interrelated zones that aim to fulfill three complementary and mutually reinforcing functions:
 The core area(s) comprises a strictly protected ecosystem that contributes to the conservation of landscapes, ecosystems, species and genetic variation.
 The buffer zone surrounds or adjoins the core areas, and is used for activities compatible with sound ecological practices that can reinforce scientific research, monitoring, training and education.
 The transition area is the part of the reserve where the greatest activity is allowed, fostering economic and human development that is socioculturally and ecologically sustainable.

Biospheres and the IUCN classification 

In 1996, the IUCN and MAB published a guideline for how to assess UNESCO biosphere reserves in the IUCN classification system. For that to work, the IUCN distinguish between the biosphere core, buffer, and transition zones, and also between each individual biosphere reserve. The most important feature for the assessment is the biosphere's management objective. Given that one of the main objectives of biospheres are scientific work, generally speaking, this would put biosphere core zones in the IUCN category I; either Ia (strict nature reserve) or Ib (wilderness area). Biosphere buffer zones would fall in category IV, V or VI and transition zones would be categorized as either V or VI if at all possible.

Working of the programme

UNESCO’s intergovernmental structure provides MAB with a framework to help national governments support the planning and implementation of research and training programmes with technical assistance and scientific advice.

Participating countries establish MAB National Committees that ensure maximum national participation in the international programme, defining and implementing each country’s activities. MAB currently operates through 158 National Committees established among the 195 Members States and nine Associate Members States of UNESCO.

The agenda of the MAB Programme is defined by its main governing body, the International Coordinating Council. The MAB Council consists of 34 member states elected by UNESCO’s General Conference. The council elects a chair and five vice-chairpersons from each of UNESCO’s geopolitical regions, one of which functions as a rapporteur. These constitute the MAB Bureau.

The MAB Secretariat is based at UNESCO’s Division of Ecological and Earth Sciences, at UNESCO's headquarter in Paris, and works closely with the different field offices around the world to coordinate the work of the MAB Programme at national and regional levels. Its staff members draw on expertise in many and varied disciplines. MAB is funded through the regular budget of UNESCO and mobilizes funds in-trust granted by Member States, bilateral and multilateral sources, and extra-budgetary funds provided by countries, the private sector and private institutions. MAB-related activities are nationally financed. The programme can grant seed funding to assist countries in developing projects and/or to secure appropriate partnership contributions.

The latest World Congress of Biosphere Reserves took place in Lima, Peru, from 14 to 17 March 2016. This will be the 4th World Congress of Biosphere Reserves and it shall develop a new vision for the decade 2016–2025.

Networks 
The World Network of Biosphere Reserves is supported by different regional, sub-regional or thematic networks. These are as follows:
 The African Biosphere Reserves Network (AfriMAB) was created in 1996 and comprises 33 African countries.
 The ArabMAB Network was officially launched in 1997 and represents 18 Arab countries.
 The East Asian Biosphere Reserve Network was launched in 1994. Today, it consists of China, the Democratic People’s Republic of Korea, Japan, Kazakhstan, Mongolia, the Republic of Korea and the Russian Federation.
 EuroMAB is the network of biosphere reserves in Europe and North America. Created in 1987, it is the largest MAB Regional Network with 53 countries.
 The Ibero-American MAB Network (IberoMAB) was created in 1992. It comprises 22 countries from Latin American and the Caribbean, Spain and Portugal.
 The Pacific Man and the Biosphere Network (PacMAB) was created in 2006 and comprises the Federated States of Micronesia, Kiribati, Palau, Papua New Guinea, Samoa and Tonga.
 The South and Central Asia MAB Network (SACAM) was created in 2002 and comprises Afghanistan, Bangladesh, Bhutan, India, Iran, Kazakhstan, Maldives, Nepal, Pakistan and Sri Lanka.
 The Southeast Asian Biosphere Reserve Network (SeaBRnet) was created in 1998. Today, it comprises Cambodia, China, Indonesia, Japan, Lao PDR, Malaysia, Myanmar, Philippines, Thailand and Viet Nam.
 The East Atlantic Biosphere Reserve Network (REDBIOS) was created in 1994. It comprises the Canary Islands (Spain), Cape Verde, Guinea Bissau, Madeira and Azores (Portugal), Mauritania, Morocco, Sao Tomé and Principe, and Senegal.
 The World Network of Island and Coastal Biosphere Reserves was established in 2012 and comprises 22 countries. It aims to study, implement and disseminate island, marine and coastal strategies to preserve biodiversity and heritage, promote sustainable development, and adapt to and mitigate the effects of climate change.

See also
 Agenda 21

References

External links
 UNESCO World Network of Biosphere Reserves
 
 A-Z of Areas of Biodiverity Importance: Biosphere Reserves (MAB)

1971 in the environment
Biodiversity
Biomes
!
Protected areas